Artesia (Spanish for "artesian aquifer") is a city in southeast Los Angeles County, California.  Artesia was incorporated on May 29, 1959, and is one of Los Angeles County's Gateway Cities. The city has a 2010 census population of 16,522. Artesia is surrounded on the west, south, and east sides by Cerritos, with Norwalk to the north. Artesia is the home of the East West Ice Palace, an ice rink which is co-owned by Michelle Kwan. It was also the childhood home of former First Lady Pat Nixon, who lived there from 1914 to 1931, though the property on which she grew up is now part of neighboring Cerritos.

History 

The village of Artesia was established upon the completion of the Artesia School District on May 3, 1875. It was named for the many flowing artesian wells in the area, which made the village ideal for farming and agriculture.

In the 1920s and 1930s, Dutch and Portuguese farmers developed Artesia into one of the most important dairy districts in Southern California. After World War II, as with many other cities in the region, Artesia was pressured by developers to build residential tracts. The city of Dairy Valley was incorporated in 1956, and later became the city of Cerritos. As the demand for housing continued, dairymen moved their operations further east into Chino and north into the Central Valley. Artesia finally incorporated on May 29, 1959.

Before Artesia was incorporated, some rural areas, like Hawaiian Gardens, were considered part of Artesia for mapping and postage purposes.

In 1993, the Artesia Historical Society was formed, with the mission of preserving and protecting the archives and historic sites of the city. In 2002, the Historical Society salvaged and restored one of the last remaining Spanish-styled homes in the city into a historical civic museum open to the public.

Characteristics

Artesia water tower 
One of the more familiar landmarks in the city is the Artesia water tower. Not much is known about its active past or when it was constructed. The City of Artesia is currently trying to have the tower declared as a Historical Landmark and is asking its citizens for historical information and photos of the tower.

The water tower can hold 50,000 gallons of water and was once owned by the Southern California Water Company before being sold to the City of Artesia in 1988. The tower was intended to be used only as a point of historical interest, and to provide a special identity to the community. Shortly after its purchase, the then green tower was quickly painted to its current color with the addition of the name Artesia painted on two sides.

It sits on top of an artesian well; built in 1911. However, no record of its construction can be found. Although it may have once been a smaller wooden tower, to qualify for historic designation in California, factual documentation must be presented.

The Artesia water tower was also featured in the motion picture Freddy's Dead: The Final Nightmare in 1991 and was known in the film as the Springwood water tower.

It was also featured in season 1, episode 17, "Didn't Pay Taxes", of the television show My Name Is Earl, in March 2006.

Cultural Shopping District 

There are a large number of Indian-owned stores and restaurants along Pioneer Boulevard in Artesia. Despite this concentration of Indian-owned businesses, Asian Indians made up only 7.9% of the population of Artesia in the 2010 Census.

Proposals have often been made to designate a portion of the city as "Little India"  (along the lines of Little Saigon in nearby Westminster and Garden Grove). Another proposal has been for a "Little India" sign at the Pioneer Boulevard exit off of the Artesia Freeway. Opposition, primarily from other ethnicities in the city, has so far balked such plans.

According to the Los Angeles Times article "Artesia Thinks the World of Itself," four of five City Council members were outraged at Assemblyman Rudy Bermudez's attempt to make the designation without consulting the local council. The council members won a bill requiring local approval of proposed freeway sign designations. Mayor Larry Nelson said that Indian Americans constituted less than 1% of the city's population and that East Asian markets outnumber Indian ones 3 to 1. Thus, the name is the "International and Cultural Shopping District."

Geography 

Artesia is located at  (33.867215, -118.080622).

Demographics

2010
At the 2010 census Artesia had a population of 16,522. The racial makeup of Artesia was 6,446 (39.0%) White (21.3% Non-Hispanic White), 589 (3.6%) African American, 94 (0.6%) Native American, 6,131 (37.1%) Asian, 40 (0.2%) Pacific Islander, 2,630 (15.9%) from other races, and 592 (3.6%) from two or more races. Hispanic or Latino of any race were 5,910 persons (35.8%).

The census reported that 15,909 people (96.3% of the population) lived in households, 69 (0.4%) lived in non-institutionalized group quarters, and 544 (3.3%) were institutionalized.

There were 4,535 households, 1,933 (42.6%) had children under the age of 18 living in them, 2,673 (58.9%) were opposite-sex married couples living together, 670 (14.8%) had a female householder with no husband present, 334 (7.4%) had a male householder with no wife present.  There were 150 (3.3%) unmarried opposite-sex partnerships, and 30 (0.7%) same-sex married couples or partnerships. 661 households (14.6%) were one person and 306 (6.7%) had someone living alone who was 65 or older. The average household size was 3.51.  There were 3,677 families (81.1% of households); the average family size was 3.80.

The age distribution was 3,719 people (22.5%) under the age of 18, 1,680 people (10.2%) aged 18 to 24, 4,421 people (26.8%) aged 25 to 44, 4,454 people (27.0%) aged 45 to 64, and 2,248 people (13.6%) who were 65 or older.  The median age was 38.2 years. For every 100 females, there were 98.4 males.  For every 100 females age 18 and over, there were 96.1 males.

There were 4,697 housing units at an average density of 2,898.2 per square mile, of the occupied units 2,523 (55.6%) were owner-occupied and 2,012 (44.4%) were rented. The homeowner vacancy rate was 0.7%; the rental vacancy rate was 3.7%.  8,930 people (54.0% of the population) lived in owner-occupied housing units and 6,979 people (42.2%) lived in rental housing units.

According to the 2010 United States Census, Artesia had a median household income of $59,845, with 13.5% of the population living below the federal poverty line.

2000
At the 2000 census there were 16,380 people in 4,470 households, including 3,625 families, in the city. The population density was 10,126.1 inhabitants per square mile (3,903.9/km). The racial makeup of the city was 44.18% White, 3.55% Black or African American, 0.78% Native American, 27.41% Asian, 0.54% Pacific Islander, 18.47% from other races, and 5.07% from two or more races.  38.29% of the population was Hispanic or Latino of any race.
Of the 4,470 households 40.7% had children under the age of 18 living with them, 60.4% were married couples living together, 14.1% had a female householder with no husband present, and 18.9% were non-families. 15.3% of households were one person and 6.7% were one person aged 65 or older.  The average household size was 3.54 and the average family size was 3.87.

The age distribution was 27.2% under the age of 18, 10.1% from 18 to 24, 29.4% from 25 to 44, 21.0% from 45 to 64, and 12.4% 65 or older.  The median age was 34 years. For every 100 females, there were 100.5 males.  For every 100 females age 18 and over, there were 95.8 males.

The median income per household in the city was $44,500, and the median income per family was $47,017. Males had a median income of $34,447 versus $25,256 for females. The per capita income for the city was $15,763.  About 8.7% of families and 11.5% of the population were below the poverty line, including 12.2% of those under age 18 and 7.4% of those age 65 or over.

Ancestry and ethnicity 

45.8% of the residents of Artesia are foreign-born, and 25.2% are not US citizens.

For Europeans, 9.4% of Artesia is of Portuguese ancestry, with 49.4% of those foreign-born. Dutch is the second most commonly reported European ancestry at 4.6%.

27.4% of Artesia is of Asian ancestry. The most commonly reported ancestries are Filipino 10.4%, Chinese 5.1%, Indian 4.6%, and Korean 4.5%.

3.6% of Artesia is Black or African American.

38.3% of Artesia is Hispanic or Latino, with most of those being of Mexican descent (32.4%).

Government

Local Government

City Council 
The City Council is composed of five members elected at large by the citizens of Artesia to serve for four-year overlapping terms. The City Council is responsible to the residents of Artesia for the implementation of all programs and services provided by the city.

City Council Meetings 
The regular meetings of the Artesia City Council are held on the second Monday of each month beginning at 7:00 p.m. at  Artesia City Hall, Council Chambers, 18747 Clarkdale Ave. Artesia, CA 90701.

Commissions 
There are four commissions serving the City of Artesia, composed of five individuals who serve voluntarily. Each member of the City Council appoints one person to each commission for a term of four years.

Disaster Council 
The Disaster Council is an advisory body to the City Council which provides policies and suggestions to the City Council to adopt for emergency circumstances like earthquakes, fires, flooding, or terrorist attack.

State and Federal Representation 

Education 
Artesia residents are served by the ABC Unified School District.

Infrastructure 
Fire protection in Artesia is provided by the Los Angeles County Fire Department with ambulance transport by Care Ambulance Service.

The Los Angeles County Sheriff's Department operates the Lakewood Station in Lakewood, serving Artesia.

The Los Angeles County Department of Health Services operates the Whittier Health Center in Whittier, serving Artesia.

The United States Postal Service Artesia Post Office is located at 11721 183rd Street.

References

External links

 Artesia Chamber of Commerce

 
Cities in Los Angeles County, California
Gateway Cities
Incorporated cities and towns in California
Little Indias
1875 establishments in California
Populated places established in 1875